Hucho bleekeri, the Sichuan taimen, is a species of freshwater fish in the salmon family (Salmonidae), endemic to the Yangtze basin in China. 
Their typical habitat includes mountain streams and small rivers, typically being found in the catchment areas of the Dadu River in Sichuan and Qinghai Provinces, as well as the Hanjiang River and its tributaries in southern Shaanxi province. This particular fish population is largely threatened by habitat loss and illegal fishing, resulting in a "critically endangered" conservation status from the International Union for Conservation of Nature.

Appearance
The vertebrates have a dark Gray back, silvery white underside, and small cross-shaped spots across the body and gill cover.

Distribution and habitats
Sichuan taimen are endemic to the Yangtze basin in China. They are found in the upper tributaries of the Yangtze River in Sichuan Province, the upper and middle reaches of the Dadu River in Sichuan and Qinghai Provinces, and the upper reaches and tributaries of the Hanjiang River in the south of the Qin Mountains of Shaanxi Province.  It dwells predominantly in fast-flowing streams with sandy and gravel substrates.  The species prefers mountain brooks at  meters above sea level with high dissolved oxygen (>5 mg/L) and a low water temperature (less than ).

Diet
Juveniles feed mostly on zooplankton and insects, while adults are largely piscivorous.

Threats
According to the IUCN, the Sichuan taimen is threatened mostly by habitat loss from the construction of hydropower stations, erosion of soil due to deforestation, road construction, and sand excavation.  Despite legal protections, the species is also threatened by illegal fishing.  Recent studies have estimated the species has endured a 50-80% decline in population over the past three generations, and the decline is expected to continue. Only an estimated 2,000-2,500 mature individuals survive. The Sichuan taimen is a first-class protected species in China.

See also
 List of endangered and protected species of China

References

Kimura, S. (1934) Description of the fishes collected from the Yangtze-kiang, China, by late Dr. K. Kishinouye and his party in 1927-1929 The Journal of the Shanghai Science Institute, Section III. Vol. I, 11-247. (original description)

bleekeri
Endemic fauna of China
Freshwater fish of China
Yangtze River
Critically endangered fish
Critically endangered fauna of Asia
Fish described in 1934
Species endangered by damming
Species endangered by habitat loss
Critically endangered fauna of China